Polygonum majus is a North American species of flowering plant in the buckwheat family known by the common name wiry knotweed. It grows in the western United States and western Canada, from British Columbia south as far as the Sierra Nevada of northwestern Inyo County in California, east as far as Montana. Knotweed is a spreading, wiry annual weed that rarely grows higher than a few inches. The leaves are tiny, oblong, bluish-green, and 14 inches broad and 1 inch long. The flowers are tiny and unobtrusive, whitish-green in colour, and appear in the leaf axils in the fall. Knotweed may grow into a dense mat with a diameter of up to three feet, strangling out ideal grass and plants. The branches of this evergreen plant form a strong, wiry mat that reaches barely a few centimeters above the earth. They appear constantly, and gardeners are always fighting them. We cultivate the soil by tilling and enriching it. We plant our flowers and veggies, but the weeds make the most of our efforts. We believe we've got situation under control, but then we walk around to discover different things growing where we didn't expect it: knotweed sprawls down our walkways and up between our patio's paving stones.

Description 
Polygonum majus is an herb up to 60 cm (2 feet) tall. Stems are thin and wiry. Flowers are white or pink. Knotweed is distinguished by its upward, splitting branches and lateral phenotypic expression. The branches of this grassy plant form a strong, wiry mat that reaches barely a few millimeters above the earth. Knotweed may grow vertically on occasion, mainly on lawns with greater shade. Knotweed has slender stems that are branching and bulging at the nodes, as well as a thin taproot. Knotweed is a brief perennial that spreads its wiry stems outward from a central taproot in a thick mat of tensile stems interrupted by tiny joints or tangles. Small blue-green leaves are green regularly from the base to the top of those stalks. There are two varieties of knotweed. Polygonum arenastrum, popularly known as wiregrass, wireweed, matweed, or doorweed, grows flat and spreads outward in a dense circular shape that can measure 18 inches (46 cm) wide with a slender taproot that can develop as thick as 18 inches (46 cm). It seldom grows taller than a couple inches (8 cm). Silver coated knotweed, Polygonum argyrocoleon, reaches a height of one foot (31 cm.) or more. It produces tall spikes with floral flowers. Garden spurge is frequently confused with knotweed by gardeners. When you recall that the trumpet vine emits a milky liquid when split, while knotweed does not, it's easy to tell them apart.

Taxonomy

Polygonum majus is the scientific name for this plant (Meisn.) Piper belongs to the Polygonaceae family. Palouse knotweed, wiry knotweed, Eastern Washington, and Native are some of the popular names for this plant. There are no synonyms for this word, and it has no conservation status.

Distribution and Habitat

Although it is one of the earliest summer perennial broadleaf weeds to appear in the spring, it can appear at any time during the spring and summer. Knotweed may thrive on lawns with a diverse combination of shadow and sunshine, but it must sprout in wet soil. Knotweed may be found all over the United States, although it thrives on compacted soils. Polygonum aviculare is its scientific name. Knotweed is distinguished by its rising, spreading branches and lateral developmental stages.  Although hand-pulling is a viable short-term strategy for eradicating Polygonum aviculare, it is not the most productive. Knotweed reproduces by producing tiny seeds (less than 1/25 of an inch). Touch can dislodge seeds from their capsules, allowing them to disperse over the grass. The most accurate means for management is to use properly chosen and administered broadleaf weed killers that are tailored to local geography and climate. Common knotweed thrives in farm land, breeding grounds, and other disturbed sites, even in weak and compressed soil. Exploitative insects are typically attracted to this plant. Japanese knotweed may be found in sunny spots inside landscapes that have been purposefully planted, along roadsides, and in riparian habitats like stream beds. Knotweeds can thrive in a variety of soil types and brightness, though they won't be as hardy if they're in the shade.

Cultural Significance

Although this plant is fertilized by insects and develops spores that are distributed by the breeze, it is the Knotweed roots (known as rhizomes) that distinguish this invasive species and are responsible for the majority of its dissemination and harm. Rhizomes are altered, fleshy branches that run horizontal underneath and may transmit root system as well as additional stems above surface; it's an efficient method used by a variety of troublesome plants. It's also why using a tarp to suffocate Knotweed is futile. In 2016, researchers in England conducted the first part of the world's largest Japanese Knotweed field study, which tested control measures. Regardless of the fact that no treated group achieved total elimination within three years, the herbicide glyphosate (a.k.a. Roundup) proved to be the most effective therapy when administered at the proper expansion phase and with the proper dose and distribution (both sprayed and injected).The herbicide glyphosate requires three to five years to manage, and its usage in New England may be susceptible to municipal permit and advertising regulations if it is near wetlands. Discontinue the use of certain extensively used weedkillers superfluous physical control strategies (cutting and replace, summertime mowing, and trench) that add gear and labour costs while increasing environmental consequences, without increasing control comparison to application alone," the researchers added.

References

External links
Jepson Manual Treatment
https://estuarymagazine.com/2021/03/the-perils-of-japanese-knotweed/
https://www.gardeningknowhow.com/plant-problems/weeds/knotweed-control.htm

majus
Flora of British Columbia
Flora of the Western United States
Plants described in 1856